Constance Mary Le Plastrier (23 January 1864 – 7 February 1938) was an Australian schoolteacher, botanist and writer. She was the first woman to be elected president of the Field Naturalists' Society of New South Wales. Shortly before her death she received the Cross of Pope Leo XIII (pro Ecclesia et Pontifice).

Life 
Le Plastrier was born in St Kilda, Victoria on 23 January 1864. She began her teaching career in Melbourne and in 1895 she converted to Roman Catholicism.

She moved to Sydney in 1900 where she was employed by Redlands School in Cremorne, teaching English, Latin and botany. She was a long-term contributor to both the Catholic Press and Sacred Heart Messenger. Her 1916 textbook, Botany for Australian students, co-written with Agnes A. Brewster, was considered "the best work to date on Australian botany, a book which has obtained a high reputation in botanical circles, at home and abroad". 

She joined the Field Naturalists' Society of New South Wales in about 1912 and in 1919 was elected president, the first woman to fill that role. In 1922, became its first female secretary. At the same time she was president of the Assistant Mistresses' Association, hon. secretary of the Teachers' Guild of NSW (since c.1913) and hon. editor of Microscopical Society of New South Wales' journal.

Le Plastrier died in the Mater Misericordiae private hospital in North Sydney on 7 February 1938. She was survived by three sisters and two brothers. Her funeral left her home at 22 Provincial Road, Lindfield for the Northern Suburbs Cemetery.

Works

As herself 

 
 Le Plastrier, Constance M. (1929), The Cloudy Porch, Sands

As Mary Lee 

 Lee, Mary (1929–30), "The Heir of Tramore" (serialised), Catholic Press
 Lee, Mary (1930–31), "Tempering the Steel" (serialised), Catholic Press

References 

1864 births
1938 deaths
Australian Roman Catholics
Converts to Roman Catholicism from Anglicanism
20th-century Australian women writers
20th-century Australian botanists
Australian non-fiction writers
19th-century Australian botanists
Writers from Melbourne
People from St Kilda, Victoria